Nicolaos Panagiotopoulos, professionally known as Nico Panagio, is a South African television presenter, actor, and businessman known for being the host of Survivor South Africa since 2010. He is also known for his previous role on the soap opera 7de Laan and as a presenter on Top Billing.

Early life and acting career

Panagio was born in Pretoria to an immigrant Greek father from Elis and attended Pretoria Boys High School. After graduating from the Method Actor's Training Centre, he went on to play minor roles in Egoli and Generations. This preceded his taking up of a contract with 7de Laan, in which he played businessman George Kyriakis. He joined Top Billing as a freelance presenter in 2007 after leaving 7de Laan and has since played in Zone 14, Ella Blue and Vallei van Sluiers. He has been hosting the M-Net reality series Survivor South Africa since its third season in 2009.

He has starred in various films, including Susanna van Biljon, Semi-Soet, Konfetti and Vrou Soek Boer. Panagio was nominated for Best Actor at the 2012 SAFTAs for his role in Semi-Soet. He co-owns the company Trade Revolution (Pty) Ltd., and is chairman of the non-profit organisation Missing Children SA.

Filmography

Television

Film

References

Living people
South African male actors
South African people of Greek descent
South African television presenters
People from Pretoria
Alumni of Pretoria Boys High School
Year of birth missing (living people)